Liam Kerr (born 23 January 1975) is a British politician of the Scottish Conservative Party, who served as Deputy Leader of the Scottish Conservative Party from 2019 to 2020 and as the Scottish Conservatives’ Shadow Cabinet Secretary for Justice from 2017 to 2021. Kerr has served as Shadow Cabinet Secretary for Net Zero, Energy & Transport since 2021 and as a Member of the Scottish Parliament (MSP) for the North East Scotland region since 2016.

Early life and education 
Liam Kerr grew up in Edinburgh, and was educated at George Watson's College, the University of St Andrews and the University of Edinburgh, where he graduated with a MA (Hons.) degree in Sociology in 1997. Having spent time employed as a chef in an Edinburgh restaurant, upon finishing his education he moved to London, working as a session musician and as a salesman in the telecoms industry. He then studied at the College of Law (now the University of Law), gaining a Common Professional Examination award in 2000 and a Legal Practice Certificate the following year.

Career 
Initially training as a lawyer with a firm based on the south coast of England, Kerr moved to Aberdeen in 2004 and became an employment lawyer. During his time at Aberdeen, he has given lectures at Robert Gordon University and the University of Aberdeen, been a director of two charities, and performed classical and jazz piano.

Kerr has been an accredited specialist employment lawyer since 2015. Prior to his election, he operated his own practice.

He is a member and former chairman of the Aberdeen 100 Round Table, and a former member of St Fittick Rotary club.

Politics
Kerr is the Scottish Conservatives' Shadow Cabinet Secretary for Justice. He served as Deputy Leader of the Scottish Conservative Party, alongside Annie Wells, under Jackson Carlaw. However, they both were dismissed and the post was abolished shortly after Douglas Ross became Scottish Conservative leader in August 2020.

In 2016, he stood for the Scottish Parliament as the Conservative candidate in Aberdeen Donside, coming second to the SNP's Mark McDonald, then was elected on the regional list.

In June 2017, Kerr was appointed by the Scottish Conservatives as their for spokesperson for Justice in the Scottish Parliament. He sits on the Justice Committee and is deputy convenor of the Public Audit and Post-legislative Scrutiny Committee.

In March 2021 Kerr voted for a motion of no confidence in First Minister Nicola Sturgeon alleging that she had knowingly misled Parliament.

In the 2021 Scottish election Kerr stood for the Aberdeen South and North Kincardine seat and came second to the SNP.

Notes

References

External links 
 

1975 births
Living people
Place of birth missing (living people)
Scottish solicitors
Labour lawyers
People educated at George Watson's College
Alumni of the University of Edinburgh
Alumni of the University of St Andrews
Alumni of The University of Law
Conservative MSPs
Members of the Scottish Parliament 2016–2021
Members of the Scottish Parliament 2021–2026